High Flyers may refer to:
 High Flyers (film), a 1937 musical comedy film
 High Flyers (Singaporean TV series), a business-themed television interview program
 High Flyers (Australian TV series), a children's television series
 High Flyers: The Best of Trapeze, a compilation album by the band Trapeze
 Yamhill High Flyers, an International Basketball League team

See also
 Highflyer (disambiguation)